This is a list of weapons used by the Luxembourg Army.

Weapons

Standard small arms and heavy weapon

Former small arms and heavy weapons

Pistols 
 Browning Hi-Power
 M1911 pistol
 Webley Revolver

Sub-machine guns 
 Sten 9×19 Parabellum
 Thompson submachine gun .45 ACP
 Sola submachine gun 9×19 Parabellum
 Uzi 9×19 Parabellum

Rifles 
 Karabiner 98k 7.92x57mm IS
 Ross rifle .303 British
 Pattern 1914 Enfield .303 British
 Lee–Enfield .303 British
 FN Model 1949 .30–06 Springfield
 FN FAL 7.62×51 NATO

Machine guns 
 Bren light machine gun .303 British
 FN BAR .30-06 Springfield
 Vickers machine gun .303 British
 M1919 Browning machine gun .30-06 Springfield
 M60 machine gun 7.62x51mm NATO

Anti-tank weapons 
 Boys anti-tank rifle .55 Boys
 PIAT
 Bazooka
 M18 recoilless rifle
 M20 recoilless rifle
 M40 recoilless rifle

Mortars 
 Two-inch mortar
 Ordnance ML 3 inch Mortar
 M19 mortar
 M1 mortar
 M2 4.2-inch mortar
 L16 81mm mortar

Vehicles

In 2028, both the Dingos and Humvees will be replaced by 80 Eagle V equipped with a .50 remote weapon station and sensor equipment as "Command, Liaison and Reconnaissance Vehicles".

References

Luxembourg Army
Luxembourg-related lists